is a generally masculine Japanese given name.

Possible writings
哲, "intelligent, philosophy, clear"
悟, "bodhi, enlightenment, apprehension"
敏, "quick, sharp"
智, "knowledge, wisdom"
聡, "intelligent, clever, bright"
慧, "bright, intelligent"
訓, "teach, instruct"
諭, "teach, to lead"

People with the name
, Japanese politician
, Japanese surgeon and astronaut
, Japanese politician
, Japanese actor and voice actor
, Japanese journalist
, Japanese voice actor
, Japanese judoka and mixed martial artist 
, Japanese jazz guitarist
, Japanese politician
, Japanese origami master
 Satoshi Kanazawa (born 1962), American-British evolutionary psychologist
, Japanese scientist
, Japanese linguist
, Illustrator
, Japanese professional wrestler
, Japanese baseball player
, film director, animator, screenwriter and manga artist
, Japanese swimmer
, Japanese actor
, Japanese computer scientist
, Japanese actor and voice actor
, Japanese journalist and the governor of Kagoshima Prefecture
, Japanese theatre director
, Japanese manga artist
, Japanese basketball player
 Satoshi Mori (skier) (born 1971), Japanese Nordic combined skier
, Japanese scholar
, Japanese race car driver
 Satoshi Nakamoto (born 1975), a presumed pseudonym of the creator of bitcoin, a digital currency; written in Japanese as サトシ・ナカモト
, Japanese computer scientist
, Japanese actor and musician
, biochemist, a winner of the 2015 Nobel Prize in Physiology or Medicine
, Japanese footballer
, Japanese cross-country skier
, Japanese manga artist
, Japanese boxer
, Japanese professional boxer
, Japanese swimmer
, Japanese businessman, banker, and the 25th Governor of the Bank of Japan
, Japanese screenwriter
, creator of Pokémon
, Japanese long jumper
, Japanese shogi player
, Japanese swimmer
, Japanese footballer
, Japanese DJ and electronic music producer
, Japanese actor
, Japanese actor and singer
, Japanese football player
, perpetrator of the Sagamihara stabbings
, manga artist and artist
, Japanese theoretical physicist
, Japanese beach volleyball player
, Japanese composer
, illustrator of Pokémon Adventures starting in volume 10
, Japanese race walker
, Japanese footballer
, Japanese professional Go player

Fictional characters
Ash Ketchum (known as Satoshi (サトシ) in Japan), the main character in the Pokémon television series
, in the Red River universe
 or Satoshi Hikari (氷狩 怜), in D.N.Angel media
Satoshi (Urusei Yatsura) (サトシ), also known as Megane, a member of Lum's Stormtroopers
, in Higurashi no Naku Koro ni media
, a racer in Initial D series
, in Hyōka
, in the Corpse Party series
, in the Food Wars: Shokugeki no Soma
, in the Kuroko's Basketball

References

Japanese masculine given names